John C. Vincent (born September 16, 1942) is an American politician in the state of Montana. He served in the Montana House of Representatives from 1975 to 1990. From 1985 to 1986 and 1989 to 1990, he was Speaker of the House. He also served as majority leader and minority leader for the 1983 and 1987 sessions respectively and majority whip in the 1979 session.  After his legislative career, he served as the mayor of Bozeman, Montana from 1994 to 1995 and as a commissioner of Bozeman from 1992 to 1995. From 2001 to 2006, he was Commissioner of Gallatin County, Montana. He was elected to the Montana Public Service (utilities) Commission in 2008, and served a four-year term.

References

1942 births
Living people
Mayors of places in Montana
Speakers of the Montana House of Representatives
Democratic Party members of the Montana House of Representatives
People from Gallatin County, Montana
People from New Haven, Connecticut